The ADO Den Haag Stadium (known as the Bingoal Stadion for sponsorship reasons) is a multi-use stadium in The Hague, Netherlands, designed by Zwarts & Jansma Architects. Completed in 2007, the stadium is used mostly for football and field hockey. It is the home stadium of ADO Den Haag. It has a capacity of 15,000 people, and replaced ADO's former stadium Zuiderpark which was considerably smaller. Due to UEFA's sponsorship regulations, the stadium is named ADO Den Haag Stadium on European matches. It was previously also known as the Cars Jeans Stadion for sponsorship reasons.

Despite being in one of the three largest cities in the Netherlands, the club's attendances have been traditionally smaller than those of their rivals Ajax, Feyenoord and PSV Eindhoven. The stadium was the venue for the 2014 Hockey World Cup.

For the last five months of 2019 it also served as the home of AZ Alkmaar, whose AFAS Stadion was undergoing major renovation after a roof collapse.

On 18 February 2022 the roof of the stadium was damaged by Storm Eunice.

Opening
The stadium was opened on 28 July 2007. In June 2010 ADO Den Haag made a naming rights agreement with Japanese firm Kyocera to change the name of the stadium to Kyocera Stadion.
 
Wim Deetman, the then-Mayor of The Hague, said that this stadium is the most secure stadium in Europe. The stadium has security cameras installed that record several pictures of every audience member and the so-called Happy Crowd Control system will take pictures of spectators when entering the stadium.

References

External links
ADO stadium entry
ADO Den Haag fansite Club Achter de Duinen
ADO Den Haag fansite ADOfans.nl
ADO stadium, The Hague | ZJA –  constructors website.

Football venues in the Netherlands
Sports venues in The Hague
ADO Den Haag
Sports venues completed in 2007